Pátzcuaro Airfield  or Purépecha Airfield is a small airport located in the town of Tzurumútaro, 3 km northeast of Pátzcuaro.

General information
This is the first airfield in Michoacán designed for Light-sport aircraft. The airfield remained inactive from 1987 until 2011, since before that time It was used by former President Lázaro Cárdenas del Río to visit Pátzcuaro. The modernization of the main runway is currently being considered, in order to be an alternative for Morelia Airport and Uruapan Airport, in addition to promoting tourism in the area of Lake Pátzcuaro. The radio frequency used for communications is 123,450.

References

External links 
MX84 in PilotNav
Airfields in Michoacán

Airports in Michoacán